"Woof"  is a song by American rapper Snoop Dogg featuring Fiend and Mystikal. was released on October 26, 1998, as the second and final single of his third studio album Da Game Is to Be Sold, Not to Be Told, with the record labels No Limit Records and Priority Records.

Track listing 
CD single
"Woof" (Album Version) (featuring Fiend and Mystikal) — 4:24
"Woof" (Instrumental) — 4:31
"It's All on a Hoe" (Bonus Track) — 5:44

Charts

Weekly charts

Year-end charts

References

1998 singles
Snoop Dogg songs
Mystikal songs
Songs written by Snoop Dogg
Songs written by Mystikal
Songs written by George Clinton (funk musician)
1998 songs